Yale Design High School is a private girls high school located in Gusan-dong, Eunpyeong-gu, Seoul.

Departments

Visual Design
Compulsory subjects
 General design
 Colour management
 Human development
 Commercial economy
 Basic computer skills

Web Design
Compulsory subjects
 Commercial economy
 Human development
 Basic computer skills

Fashion Design
Compulsory subjects
 General design
 Computer graphic
 Drawing 
 Portfolio

Interior Design
Compulsory subjects
 General design
 Computer graphic
 Drawing

Principals
List of principals of Yale Design High School:
 1st: Kim Ye-hwan (1965—2000)
 2nd: Kim Young-woo (2000—2001)
 3rd: Kwon Young-mun (2001—2004)
 4th: Han Cheol-soo (2004—2007.03.02)
 5th: Kim Ye-hwan (2007.03.02—2013.03.01)
 6th: Jo Jae-seong (2013.03.01—present)

References

External links
 

High schools in Seoul
Seocho District
Educational institutions established in 1965
1965 establishments in South Korea